Worland is an unincorporated community in western Bates County, in the U.S. state of Missouri. The community is on Missouri Route U one mile from the Missouri-Kansas border. Butler is 14 miles to the northeast.

History
Worland was platted in 1888, and named after Harry Worland, who ran a local pharmacy. A post office called Worland was established in 1887, and remained in operation until 1952.

References

Unincorporated communities in Bates County, Missouri
Unincorporated communities in Missouri